FCH and double SH3 domains protein 1 is a protein that in humans is encoded by the FCHSD1 gene.

References

Further reading